The Khan Murjan is a building in the souq of Baghdad, Iraq. The crenellated arches of brick and perforated windows make this a notable piece of architecture.

The building was reputedly in a state of disrepair for over two centuries, with waist-high flood water from the Tigris standing in the famous hallway. 

In 1937, a Museum of Arab Antiquities was opened in the former Khan Murjan

By the mid-1980s, the building had been restored and was in use as a restaurant.

Gallery

References

Sources 
 

Buildings and structures in Baghdad
Murjan
Jalayirids